Palau de la Música Catalana is an album recorded during a live concert in the Palau de la Música Catalana by Beth, designed by Lluís Domènech i Montaner, and released as a 2-CD album.

Track listing
 Cabalgando
 Strength, Courage & Wisdom
 Hoy
 Drive
 Otra realidad
 Walk Away
 Vuelvo a por ti
 Head Over Feet
 Lately
 La luz
 Stay (Wasting Time)
 No woman no cry
 Parando el tiempo
 Message in a Bottle
 Roxanne
 Every Breath You Take
 Eclipse
 Eleanor Rigby
 Pol petit
 Estás
 Boig per tu

Beth (singer) albums
2004 live albums

References